Buena Vista Social Club is a Cuban music revival group founded in 1996.

Buena Vista Social Club may also refer to:
 Buenavista Social Club, 1940s member's club in Havana
 Buena Vista Social Club (album), a 1997 album by the group
 Buena Vista Social Club (film), a 1999 documentary film about the group
 Buena Vista Social Club: Adios, a 2017 documentary film about the group
 "Buenavista Social Club" (composition), a danzón by Israel López "Cachao"